Fabio Roli is a Full Professor of Computer Engineering at the University of Genova, he previously was with the University of Cagliari, Italy. He is Founding Director of the Pattern Recognition and Applications laboratory at the University of Cagliari. He was named Fellow of the Institute of Electrical and Electronics Engineers (IEEE) in 2012 for contributions to multiple classifier systems. Roli was also named a fellow of the International Association for Pattern Recognition in 2004 for contributions to pattern recognition and its applications and multiple classifier systems. He is a recipient of the Pierre Devijver Award for his contributions to statistical pattern recognition.

References

External links

20th-century births
Living people
Italian computer scientists
Academic staff of the University of Cagliari
Fellow Members of the IEEE
Fellows of the International Association for Pattern Recognition
Year of birth missing (living people)
Place of birth missing (living people)